The Bank Holidays Act 1871 established public holidays (known as bank holidays) in addition to those customarily recognised in the United Kingdom.

The Act designated four bank holidays in England, Wales and Ireland (Easter Monday; Whit Monday; First Monday in August; 26 December if a weekday) and five in Scotland (New Year's Day, or the next day if a Sunday; Good Friday; First Monday in May; First Monday in August; and Christmas Day, or the next day if a Sunday).

In England, Wales and Ireland, Good Friday and Christmas Day were considered traditional days of rest (as were Sundays) and therefore it was felt unnecessary to include them in the Act; especially as the Act extended the existing law relating to those days to the new bank holidays.

The Act was repealed in 1971 and superseded by the Banking and Financial Dealings Act 1971, which remains in force.

References

External links
 Text of the Act, as originally enacted
 

1871 in economics
United Kingdom Acts of Parliament 1871
Working time
Banking legislation in the United Kingdom
Public holidays in the United Kingdom
Repealed United Kingdom Acts of Parliament